Arsissa atlantica is a species of snout moth in the genus Arsissa. It was described by Jan Asselbergs in 2009 and is known from the Canary Islands.

References

Moths described in 2009
Phycitini
Moths of Africa